Olga Shekel (born 28 May 1994) is a Ukrainian road racing cyclist, who currently rides for UCI Women's Continental Team .

For the 2021 season, Shekel will join the Dubai Police team for its first season at UCI level.

Career
She was a silver medalist in the under-23 time trial at the 2015 European Road Championships. A few days before the start, she was injured in a car crash. "I have suffered from pain all night, was nervous, but it is the most important that I am healthy. God has rewarded me for assiduity and sufferings. I am happy," – said she in an interview.

Major results

2012
8th Time Trial, National Road Championships

2013
National Road Championships
10th Time Trial
10th Road Race

2015
2nd U23 Time Trial, European Road Championships
National Road Championships
4th Time Trial
4th Road Race

2017
2nd VR Women ITT
National Road Championships
3rd Road Race
7th Time Trial
9th Time Trial, European Road Championships

2018
National Road Championships
1st  Road Race
3rd Time Trial
2nd Horizon Park Women Challenge
3rd VR Women ITT
5th Overall Tour of Eftalia Hotels and Velo Alanya
8th Overall Giro della Toscana Int. Femminile – Memorial Michela Fanini

2019
National Road Championships
1st  Road Race
3rd Time Trial
1st Visegrad 4 Ladies Series Hungary
1st Chabany 
2nd GP Alanya

2020
National Road Championships
1st  Time Trial
2nd Road Race
1st Grand Prix Gazipaşa

2022
1st Grand Prix Gazipaşa
 2nd Overall Princess Anna Vasa Tour
6th GP Mediterrennean

References

External links

Living people
Ukrainian female cyclists
1994 births